Charaxes zambeziensis, the Zambezi charaxes, is a butterfly in the family Nymphalidae. It is found in Zimbabwe.

Adults are attracted to fermenting elephant dung. They have been recorded on wing in February and December.

References

Butterflies described in 1994
zambeziensis
Endemic fauna of Zimbabwe
Butterflies of Africa